James Dreyfus (born 9 October 1968) is an English actor most notable for roles on television sitcoms The Thin Blue Line as Constable Kevin Goody, and Gimme Gimme Gimme as Tom Farrell. Dreyfus is most recently known for a role as Reverend Roger in Mount Pleasant.

Early life 
Born in London, Dreyfus was educated at Harrow School. He then trained at the Royal Academy of Dramatic Art. His parents divorced when he was very young.

Career 

In 1998, Dreyfus won the Best Supporting Performance in a Musical Olivier Award for his work in The Lady in the Dark at the National Theatre. In the same year, Dreyfus was nominated for the Ian Charleson Award for a performance as Cassius in Shakespeare's Julius Caesar at the Birmingham Rep.

Dreyfus's first television break came with the BBC comedy series Absolutely Fabulous. followed by roles as Constable Kevin Goody in Ben Elton's sitcom The Thin Blue Line and Tom Farrell, the gay flatmate of Linda (Kathy Burke) in Gimme Gimme Gimme. Dreyfus played opposite Bette Midler in the short-lived American sitcom Bette.

Known for portraying "camp, endearing characters," Dreyfus (in a Sheengate Publishing interview) compared the character Frank Spencer from Some Mothers Do 'Ave 'Em, whom he described as a campy but married heterosexual, to Dreyfus's character Kevin Goody from The Thin Blue Line. Regarding his character Tom Farrell from Gimme Gimme Gimme, Dreyfus hypothesized that, even if the character were heterosexual, the actor would still portray Tom as camp and flamboyant. Furthermore, Dreyfus said that he felt that he became typecast due to his portrayals of "flamboyant" characters.

He played Thermoman in the BBC One comedy My Hero, a role he took over in the sixth series from Ardal O'Hanlon. Although the same character, he used the name George Monday, as opposed to Ardal O'Hanlon's character's name, George Sunday. After disappointing ratings, the show was cancelled.

Dreyfus also starred as Mr Teasy-Weasy in the 2004 comedy film Churchill: The Hollywood Years.

From 2012 to 2017, Dreyfus appeared as Reverend Roger in the Sky Living series Mount Pleasant.

In 2017, he voiced an incarnation of The Master from Doctor Who in the Big Finish Productions release The First Doctor Adventures Volume One, going on to appear as the character in 2019's 'The Home Guard', 2020's 'The Psychic Circus' and 2022's 'Blood of the Time Lords'. In an interview on SpectatorTV, Dreyfus claimed he was dismissed from the role following comments made on Twitter in support of author JK Rowling.

Personal life
In a 2021 interview with Andrew Boyle, Dreyfus "Authenticity is about acting and making it authentic, that's what acting is [...] and real, and moving you. I thought the whole point was we get to a stage where being gay wouldn't be an issue. I wouldn't be introduced as 'James Dreyfus, the gay actor', which I spent twenty years going through [...] 'openly gay' as if it was some ghastly, terrible secret. I was really hoping that would be where we are with less labels, not more."

Selected works

References

External links 

1968 births
Living people
English male film actors
English male television actors
English male stage actors
English male musical theatre actors
English male voice actors
English male radio actors
People from Chiswick
Male actors from London
Alumni of RADA
Laurence Olivier Award winners
English gay actors
People educated at Harrow School
English male Shakespearean actors
British male comedy actors
20th-century English male actors
21st-century English male actors